Side by Side is a 1994 studio album by pianist Oscar Peterson and violinist Itzhak Perlman.

Track listing
 "Dark Eyes" (Traditional) – 6:08
 "Stormy Weather" (Harold Arlen, Ted Koehler) – 4:50
 "Georgia on My Mind" (Hoagy Carmichael, Stuart Gorrell) – 5:42
 "Blue Skies" (Irving Berlin) – 4:43
 "Misty" (Sonny Burke, Erroll Garner) – 5:34
 "Mack the Knife" (Marc Blitzstein, Bertolt Brecht, Kurt Weill) – 3:29
 "Nighttime" (Oscar Peterson) – 6:13
 "I Loves You, Porgy" (George Gershwin, Ira Gershwin, DuBose Heyward) – 4:47
 "On the Trail" (Harold Adamson, Ferde Grofé) – 4:33
 "Yours Is My Heart Alone" (Franz Lehár, Fritz Löhner-Beda) – 5:24
 "Makin' Whoopee" (Walter Donaldson, Gus Kahn) – 4:44
 "Why Think About Tomorrow?" (Peterson) – 5:23

Performers
 Oscar Peterson – piano
 Itzhak Perlman – violin
 Herb Ellis – guitar
 Ray Brown – double bass
 Grady Tate – drums

References

1994 albums
Oscar Peterson albums
Itzhak Perlman albums
Telarc Records albums
Collaborative albums